Maury Anthony Buford (born February 18, 1960) is a former American football punter in the National Football League for the San Diego Chargers, the Chicago Bears and the New York Giants. Buford attended Texas Tech and was selected by the Chargers in the 1982 NFL Draft. He won a Super Bowl ring as a member of the 1985 Chicago Bears in Super Bowl XX.  He was also a member of the "Shuffling Crew Band" in the video The Super Bowl Shuffle, "playing" cowbell.

During Super Bowl XLIV, Buford joined other members of the 1985 Chicago Bears in resurrecting the Super Bowl Shuffle in a Boost Mobile commercial.

He now lives in the Dallas/Ft. Worth area and is the owner of Buford Roofing, Inc.  He is a licensed insurance adjuster in the State of Texas where he provides residential and commercial roofing services.

References

External links
databaseFootball.com
Chicago Bears official site
Buford Roofing, Inc official site

1960 births
Living people
American football punters
Players of American football from Texas
People from Mount Pleasant, Texas
Texas Tech Red Raiders football players
San Diego Chargers players
Chicago Bears players
New York Giants players